WJVS (88.3 FM) was a student-run radio station in Cincinnati, Ohio and operated by the Great Oaks Institute of Technology and Career Development, and based at the Sharonville, Ohio school. On May 10, 2012, the station's transmitter failed, and the station, which had been scheduled to permanently shut down May 18, decided to end broadcasting at that time.

WJVS shared its frequency with WAIF, also located in Cincinnati. WJVS operated during the normal school year, Monday through Friday, from 8:00 am to 2:20 P.M.

References

External links

 Radio Stations in the Cincinnati OH Metro area at ontheradio.net

JVS
Defunct radio stations in the United States
2012 disestablishments in Ohio
Radio stations disestablished in 2012
JVS